The 2022–23 Toto Cup Leumit was the 33rd season of the second tier League Cup (as a separate competition) since its introduction. It was divided into two stages. First, the sixteen Liga Leumit teams were divided into four regionalized groups, the groups winners with the best record advancing to the semi-final, while the rest of the clubs were scheduled to play classification play-offs accordance according the group results.

Beitar Tel Aviv Bat Yam are the defending champions.

Group stage
Groups were allocated according to geographic distribution of the clubs

Group A

</onlyinclude>

Group B

</onlyinclude>

Group C

</onlyinclude>

Group D

</onlyinclude>

Classification play-offs

13-16th classification play-offs

9-12th classification play-offs

5-8th classification play-offs

Semi-final

Final

Final rankings

See also
 2022–23 Toto Cup Al
 2022–23 Liga Leumit

References

External links

Leumit
Toto Cup Leumit
Toto Cup Leumit